Robert Clinton Belloni (April 4, 1919 – November 3, 1999) was a United States district judge of the United States District Court for the District of Oregon. He was instrumental in upholding Native American fishing rights in the Pacific Northwest.

Education and career

Belloni was from Myrtle Point, Oregon. Some sources state that he was born in Riverton, Oregon. He received a Bachelor of Arts degree from the University of Oregon in 1941 and a Juris Doctor from the University of Oregon School of Law in 1951. He was a lieutenant in the United States Army from 1942 to 1946. He entered private practice in Coquille, Oregon from 1951 to 1952, then practiced in Myrtle Point from 1952 to 1957. He was a City Councilman for Myrtle Point from 1953 to 1957, and was the Mayor of Myrtle Point in 1957. He served as a Judge of the Oregon Circuit Court for Coos County and Curry County from 1957 to 1967.

Federal judicial service

Belloni was nominated by President Lyndon B. Johnson on February 21, 1967, to a seat on the United States District Court for the District of Oregon vacated by Judge William G. East. He was confirmed by the United States Senate on April 4, 1967, and received his commission on April 4, 1967. He served as Chief Judge from 1971 to 1976. He assumed senior status on April 4, 1984. He took inactive senior status in 1995. His service terminated on November 3, 1999, due to his death of congestive heart failure in a retirement home in San Mateo, California.

See also
 Sohappy v. Smith

References

External links
 
 U.S. District Court for the District of Oregon (Official website)
 The Oregon History Project

1919 births
1999 deaths
People from Myrtle Point, Oregon
University of Oregon School of Law alumni
Oregon state court judges
Judges of the United States District Court for the District of Oregon
United States district court judges appointed by Lyndon B. Johnson
20th-century American judges
American people of Italian descent
People from Curry County, Oregon
Mayors of places in Oregon
United States Army officers
United States Army personnel of World War II